Bear Creek is a stream in Hamilton and Story counties, Iowa, in the United States. It is a tributary of the South Branch Skunk River.

According to tradition, Bear Creek received its  name from a pioneer incident when a man shot a black bear near its course.

References

Rivers of Hamilton County, Iowa
Rivers of Story County, Iowa
Rivers of Iowa